Embaloh (Maloh) is an Austronesian (Dayak) language of spoken in West Kalimantan, Indonesia. Apart from Taman, it is not close to other languages on Borneo, but rather belongs to the South Sulawesi languages closest to Buginese. Many speakers of Embaloh also speak Iban, leading to the adoption of some Iban loanwords into Embaloh.

The Kalis dialect (Kalis Maloh) may be a distinct language.

References

Bibliography
K. Alexander Adelaar and Nikolaus Himmelmann, The Austronesian languages of Asia and Madagascar. Routledge, 2005.

Languages of Indonesia
South Sulawesi languages